St Colum's is a Gaelic Athletic Association junior A club in both hurling and football in the Carbery division, located in Treanamadaree, County Cork, Ireland.

History
The club was formed in 1970 to facilitate Gaelic Athletic Association for people living in the Kealkill area (e.g. Cappabue, Carriganass, Borlin, Ardnagashel, Coomhola etc.) instead of travelling to clubs further away like Bantry Blues, Glengariff, Dohenys, Ballingeary etc.
The club was founded by Fr John McCarthy (a native of Newcestown) who was appointed curate to Kealkil in 1970. The first meeting of the club was held in Coomhola National School on 8 December 1970. In 1971, the club entered teams in all grades open to it, and in the very first year reached the final of the West Cork Junior B Hurling Championship, only to be beaten after a replay by Bandon on the first Sunday in January 1972. St Colum's Camogie Club was formed on 27 April 2009.

Roll of honour

In 1997, St Colum's defeated Glengariff in Bantry to win the Junior B county title and move into Junior A. In 2003, St Colum's defeated Lisgoold to win the Cork Junior Hurling Championship. In 2013, the club's junior footballers defeated Caheragh to win the West Cork Final for the first time. They subsequently reached the county final but were narrowly defeated by Mitchelstown. 2013 also saw the hurlers reaching the hurling decider in Carbery losing to Dohenys.

 Cork Junior Football Championship (0): Runner-Up 2013
 Cork Junior B Hurling Championship (1): 2003
 Cork Junior B Football Championship (1): 1997
Cork Minor C Football Championship (2): 2018,2019
 South West Junior A Football Championship (1): 2013
 South West Junior A Hurling Championship (0): Runner-Up 1986, 2013, 2016
 West Cork Junior B Hurling Championship (3): 1982, 1994, 2003
 West Cork Junior B Football Championship (3): 1985, 1996, 1997
 West Cork Junior C Football Championship (4): 2006, 2007, 2016, 2017
 West Cork Junior D Football Championship (1): 2001
 West Cork Minor A Hurling Championship (1): 1980
 West Cork Minor B Hurling Championship (5): 1973, 1974, 1975, 2000, 2001
 West Cork Minor C Football Championship (1): 2018
 West Cork Minor C Hurling Championship (3): 2007, 2009, 2010
 West Cork Under-21 B Hurling Championship (6): 1974, 1975, 1979, 1994, 1996, 2001
 West Cork Under-21 B Football Championship (4): 1972, 1974, 1975, 1995
 West Cork Under-21 C Football Championship (2): 2007, 2013

Notable players
 Alan O'Connor

References

External links
Official St Colum's Club website

Gaelic football clubs in County Cork
Hurling clubs in County Cork
Gaelic games clubs in County Cork